Christopher Berneck (born 10 July 1992) is a German figure skater. He won four senior international medals and became a two-time German national bronze medalist (2011, 2015).

Personal life 
Berneck was born on 10 July 1992 in Bad Säckingen, Germany. In 2015, he began studying fashion communication at Ryerson University in Toronto, Ontario, Canada.

Career 
Berneck started skating in 1998 at the ice rink in Herrischried, Black Forest, Germany. He initially competed for EHC Herrischried. In 1999, he and his family moved to Garmisch-Partenkirchen where he trained with Wolfgang Danne and Harold Williams. He represented SC Riessersee. During his time in Garmisch-Partenkirchen, Berneck competed in European Criterium events and won the 2001–02 cubs boys overall category, winning all three events he competed in, including the Hellmut Seibt Memorial, where U.S. skater Keegan Messing placed third in the same category.

In 2001, Berneck returned to his home town, Görwihl, and trained at the Stuttgart training center, competing for the TUS Eissport-Stuttgart, before moving to Berlin in 2003. He trained under Romy Oesterreich at the Sportforum Hohenschoenhausen until 2007, when the family moved to Wilmington, Delaware, United States. In June 2011, Berneck and his family moved to Barrie, Ontario, Canada. He then trained at the Mariposa International Training Center with Robert Tebby, Doug Leigh, Tugba Karademir, Steven Cousins, Lee Barkell and other coaches.

Programs

Results 
CS: Challenger Series; JGP: Junior Grand Prix

References

External links
 
 Christopher Berneck at Tracings.net

German male single skaters
1992 births
Living people
People from Bad Säckingen
Sportspeople from Freiburg (region)